Payaslian may refer to:

 Simon Payaslian, Armenian academic
 Zareh I Payaslian (1915-1963), Armenian catholicos